Edward MacGennis (1847–1906) was an Irish prelate of the Roman Catholic Church who served as the Bishop of Kilmore from 1888 to 1906.

Born in the parish of Kilmore, County Cavan, Ireland on 3 April 1847, he was educated at St Patrick's College, Cavan and St Patrick's College, Maynooth. He was ordained to the priesthood in circa 1870. MacGennis was the parish priest of Drumlane from 1886 to 1888. He was appointed the Bishop of the Diocese of Kilmore by Pope Leo XIII on 21 February 1888 and was consecrated on 15 April 1888.

Bishop MacGennis died in office on 15 May 1906, aged 59.

Notes

References

 
 

1847 births
1906 deaths
Roman Catholic bishops of Kilmore
19th-century Roman Catholic bishops in Ireland
20th-century Roman Catholic bishops in Ireland
People from County Cavan
Alumni of St Patrick's College, Maynooth
People educated at St Patrick's College, Cavan